David Wheaton (born June 2, 1969) is an American author, radio host, columnist, and former professional tennis player.

Personal
Born in Minneapolis as the youngest of four children. In his tennis carrier, he dated tennis star Mary Joe Fernández around 1990-1992. Wheaton married in 2009 and has one son.

Tennis career
Wheaton started tennis at age four, played in his first tournament at eight, won the Minnesota State High School tennis title in 1984 as a freshman, trained at the Nick Bollettieri Tennis Academy for his last two-and-a-half years of high school, played one year at Stanford, and then competed for 13 years on the professional tour.

Juniors
In 1987, Wheaton won the US Open junior title and was the No. 1 ranked junior player in the US. In 1988, he helped Stanford University's tennis team win the NCAA team title and received the Block S Award as the most outstanding freshman athlete at Stanford.

Pro tour
Wheaton turned professional on July 4, 1988 and won his first top-level singles title in 1990 at the U.S. Clay Court Championships in Kiawah Island, South Carolina. He was also runner-up in the 1990 US Open men's doubles (with Paul Annacone).

The most significant highlights of his career came in 1991. He won the Grand Slam Cup in Munich, beating Michael Chang in straight sets in the final 7–5, 6–2, 6–4. He also reached the semifinals of singles at Wimbledon (beating Petr Korda, Cédric Pioline, Ivan Lendl, Jan Gunnarsson and Andre Agassi in the quarterfinals before being knocked-out by Boris Becker), and was a men's doubles runner-up at the Australian Open (partnering with his former Stanford teammate Patrick McEnroe). Wheaton reached his career-high singles ranking of world No. 12 in July 1991.

During his career, Wheaton won three top-level singles and three doubles titles, representing the US in Davis Cup (v. Australia, 1993) reached the semifinals or better in either singles or doubles of every Grand Slam tournament, and defeated highly ranked players such as Andre Agassi, Jimmy Connors, Ivan Lendl, Stefan Edberg, Jim Courier, and Michael Chang.

He retired from the professional tour in 2001, following a series of injuries. Since then he has played in some senior tour events, winning the "Wimbledon Over 35 Doubles" championship in 2004 (with T.J. Middleton).

Junior Grand Slam finals

Singles: 1 (1 title)

Doubles: 1 (1 runner-up)

ATP career finals

Singles: 7 (3 titles, 4 runner-ups)

Doubles: 15 (3 titles, 12 runner-ups)

ATP Challenger and ITF Futures finals

Singles: 2 (1–1)

Doubles: 1 (1–0)

Performance timelines

Singles

Doubles

Mixed doubles

Radio and writing career
In 2002, Wheaton embarked a new career in radio, writing, and speaking. He is the producer and host of The Christian Worldview, a live talk radio program that airs on 250 stations in the US. He is a tennis columnist for the Minneapolis Star-Tribune and the author of two books, University of Destruction: Your Game Plan for Spiritual Victory on Campus (Bethany House, 2005) and My Boy, Ben—A Story of Love, Loss and Grace (Tristan Publishing, 2014).

Service and awards
Wheaton serves on the board of The Overcomer Foundation, a non-profit organization that directs his radio ministry. He also served on the board of directors of the United States Tennis Association (USTA) from 2003-2006. He is a member of the Intercollegiate Tennis Hall of Fame (class of 2012) and the USTA Northern Section Hall of Fame (class of 2005). Wheaton received the Eugene L. Scott Renaissance Award in 2011—an award presented to a national/international tennis champion who demonstrates excellence in promoting and developing the sport of tennis in public parks.

External links and sources
 David Wheaton's Radio Show – The Christian Worldview
 
 
 

1969 births
American Christians
American male tennis players
Grand Slam (tennis) champions in boys' singles
Hopman Cup competitors
Living people
Sportspeople from Minneapolis
Stanford Cardinal men's tennis players
Tennis people from Minnesota
US Open (tennis) junior champions